Kaffebrenneriet AS is a chain of coffeeshops in Norway. Set up in 1994, this company modeled its coffeeshops on those that can be found on the West Coast of the United States. Kaffebrenneriet grew further in 1999 with NorgesGruppen buying a third of the shares and, the following year, Kaffebrenneriet started its own bakery ‘lab’, which provides 21 retail points.

20 coffeeshops in the capital Oslo and one near Oslo (in Asker, about 20 minutes from the city center), and a webshop, Kaffebrenneriet employs more than 200 full- and part-time workers.

See also

 List of coffeehouse chains

External links
Kaffebrenneriet official website (bokmål Norwegian)
Kaffebrenneriet in the news (English)

Coffeehouses and cafés
Restaurant chains in Norway